The Netherlands was represented by the group Harmony, with the song "'t Is OK", at the 1978 Eurovision Song Contest, which took place in Paris on 22 April. Harmony were the winners of the Dutch national final for the contest, held on 22 February.

Before Eurovision

Nationaal Songfestival 1978 
The final was held at the Congresgebouw in The Hague, hosted by Willem Duys. Four acts took part performing two songs each and voting was by 10-member juries in the eleven Dutch provinces, with an additional jury made up of ten former Dutch Eurovision participants (Teddy Scholten, Greetje Kauffeld, De Spelbrekers, Conny Vandenbos, Lenny Kuhr, Maggie MacNeal, Getty Kaspers of Teach-In, Sandra Reemer and Heddy Lester). Each juror awarded one point to his/her favourite song, with 120 points available in total. After a rather confused voting procedure (during which the juries in Gelderland and South Holland originally tried to award more than 10 points apiece), "'t Is OK" emerged the winner by a 12-point margin.

At Eurovision 
On the night of the final Harmony performed 11th in the running order, following Belgium and preceding Turkey. Along with the United Kingdom's Co-Co, Harmony came in for some criticism for their garish and clashing stage costumes. At the close of voting "'t Is OK" had received 37 points from eight countries, placing the Netherlands 13th of the 20 entries. The Dutch jury reciprocated the Israeli 12 points by awarding its 12 to contest winner "A-Ba-Ni-Bi".

The Dutch conductor at the contest was Harry van Hoof.

Voting

References

External links 
 Dutch Preselection 1978

1978
Countries in the Eurovision Song Contest 1978
Eurovision